Trimeresurus sabahi barati, commonly known as the Sumatran green pit viper or the Barat bamboo pitviper, is a subspecies of Trimeresurus sabahi. The IUCN Red List treats it as a distinct species, and others have considered it subspecies of Trimeresurus popeiorum or Trimeresurus gramineus. It is endemic to Sumatra (Indonesia), including some nearby smaller islands.

Description
The scalation includes 17–19 rows of dorsal scales at midbody, 142–157/146–160 ventral scales in males/females, 62–72/55–58 subcaudal scales in males/females, and 9–11 supralabial scales.

Geographic range
Found in Indonesia on Sumatra and in the Mentawai Archipelago. The type locality given is "Solok, Sumatra".

References

Further reading
Regenass, Urs; Kramer, Eugen. 1981. Zur Systematik der grünen Grubenotter der Gattung Trimeresurus (Serpentes, Crotalidae). Rev. Suisse de Zool. 88 (1): 163–205.

popeiorum barati
Snakes of Southeast Asia
Reptiles of Indonesia
Endemic fauna of Sumatra